The 2019–20 Campeonato Nacional de Fútbol de Cuba was the 109th season of the Campeonato Nacional de Fútbol de Cuba, the top division football competition in Cuba. The season was broken into an Apertura and Clausura season, similar to competitions in much of Central America. The Apertura season began on 9 November 2019 and concluded on 21 December 2019. The Clausura season began on 25 January 2020 and was scheduled to conclude on 2 May 2020. On 15 March 2020, the competition was suspended due to concerns surrounding the worldwide COVID-19 pandemic. 

The competition was originally scheduled to restart on 30 April 2020, but was ultimately cancelled on 23 June 2020. No Clausura champion was awarded.

Apertura

Group A (Occidental) 
</onlyinclude>

Group B (Oriental) 
</onlyinclude>

Playoffs

Clausura 
</onlyinclude>

Playoffs 
The playoffs were cancelled due to the COVID-19 pandemic.

Notes

References 

2019-20
2019–20 in Caribbean football leagues
2019 in Cuban football
Cuba
2020 in Cuban sport